Scott John Tynan (born 27 November 1983) is an English footballer who plays as a goalkeeper.

Career

Wigan Athletic
Born in Liverpool, Merseyside, Scott began his career at Wigan Athletic during the 2001–02 season, providing backup for the first-team goalkeepers, but he failed to make any significant backthrough into the first-team and was released after just one season with the club.

Nottingham Forest
Following Tynan's release from his Wigan Athletic contract, he teamed up with Nottingham Forest for the 2002–03 season. In total Scott spent two season with the club, again providing cover for the first-team and failing to make any appearances for the club, and left the club at the end of the 2003–04 season.

Telford United
During Tynan's time with Nottingham Forest, his lack of first team action prompted a loan move to Telford in order to get some experience, and Tynan enjoyed a two-month spell with the club, before returning to Nottingham Forest.

Barnet
Tynan joined Barnet in 2004 making 35 league appearances and gaining a Conference winner's medal.

Rushden & Diamonds
He signed for Rushden & Diamonds midway through the 2005–06 season for £20,000. In one of his first few games for the club, Tynan was approached by one of his own supporters who confronted the goalkeeper during an away match at Cheltenham Town in an incident that Tynan said was "blown out of proportion". The supporter was subsequently banned for life despite Tynan's statement in his defence. Despite for the most part enjoying his second season at Diamonds, Tynan requested his contract be cancelled by mutual consent after a mixture of becoming disillusioned by then manager Garry Hill and a desire to be closer to his home in Liverpool.

Hereford United
In August 2006, Tynan was loaned to Hereford United for a short spell as emergency goalkeeping cover for Wayne Brown who was injured in the opening game of the season against Stockport County. During this loan spell Tynan enjoyed a good run of form and played his part in some memorable games, most notably the 3–0 defeat of Coventry City in the League Cup. He had his contract cancelled by Rushden in May 2007 at his own request.

Ebbsfleet United
After a trial at Morecambe Tynan signed for Ebbsfleet United on 10 August 2007, a day before the new season, to cover for Lance Cronin who sustained a finger injury. He played seven games for the club, and achieving Man of the Match in 3 before leaving in September to find a club in the north-west. Tynan is said to have really enjoyed his time at Ebbsfleet but became frustrated with the amount of travelling involved in the short-term deal.

Northwich Victoria
Tynan signed for Northwich Victoria, making his debut against Exeter City on 13 October 2007. He moved to Salford City in February 2010. He went on to sign an 18-month contract and after an impressive first season gained an international re-call with the England C Team and helping them to win the 4 Nations Tournament in Wales, the second time Tynan had won that particular competition before jetting off to Grenada and Barbados for a double header against their full international teams. Northwich decided against renewing Tynan's contract after he suffered a full thickness tear of his ACL in the league game against Histon which was played at Altrincham's ground due to Vics being locked out of their Marston's Arena home due to unpaid debts.

Vauxhall Motors
Tynan joined Vauxhall Motors in the summer of 2010. He was part of their most successful season in recent times helping them reach the 1st round proper of the FA Cup in which they faced Hartlepool United who were then second in League 2. Tynan suffered a horrific leg injury late in the second half with the game at 0-0. The injury was caused by Richie Humphreys who as a result received his marching orders for the first time in his career. Tynan unfortunately missed the replay at Rivacre Park 2 weeks later where Motors were narrowly beaten.

Billinge FC
Tynan signs for Cheshire League Billinge FC February 2013 making his debut against Greenalls PSOB scored 3 goals from goal kicks in 2016

References

External links

 
 

1983 births
Living people
Footballers from Liverpool
English footballers
England semi-pro international footballers
Association football goalkeepers
Wigan Athletic F.C. players
Nottingham Forest F.C. players
Barnet F.C. players
Rushden & Diamonds F.C. players
Hereford United F.C. players
Ebbsfleet United F.C. players
Northwich Victoria F.C. players
Salford City F.C. players
Vauxhall Motors F.C. players
English Football League players
National League (English football) players
Telford United F.C. players